Melanthius (Greek: Μελάνθιος) may refer to:

 Melanthius, a painter of ancient Greece
 Melanthius, a 5th-century BC Athenian tragic poet known only as a satirical target for Aristophanes in the plays Peace and The Birds
 Melanthius (Odyssey), a minor character in Homer's Odyssey
 Melanthius, a character in the fantasy film Sinbad and the Eye of the Tiger
 Melanthius (crater), an impact crater on Tethys, a moon of Saturn
 Melanthius, a quadrangle of the moon Tethys